In geometry, the truncated order-6 octagonal tiling is a uniform tiling of the hyperbolic plane. It has Schläfli symbol of t{8,6}.

Uniform colorings 
A secondary construction t{(8,8,3)} is called a truncated trioctaoctagonal tiling:

Symmetry 

The dual to this tiling represent the fundamental domains of [(8,8,3)] (*883) symmetry. There are 3 small index subgroup symmetries constructed from [(8,8,3)] by mirror removal and alternation. In these images fundamental domains are alternately colored black and white, and mirrors exist on the boundaries between colors. 

The symmetry can be doubled as 862 symmetry by adding a mirror bisecting the fundamental domain.

Related polyhedra and tiling

References
 John H. Conway, Heidi Burgiel, Chaim Goodman-Strass, The Symmetries of Things 2008,  (Chapter 19, The Hyperbolic Archimedean Tessellations)

See also

Tilings of regular polygons
List of uniform planar tilings
List of regular polytopes

External links 

 Hyperbolic and Spherical Tiling Gallery
 KaleidoTile 3: Educational software to create spherical, planar and hyperbolic tilings
 Hyperbolic Planar Tessellations, Don Hatch

Hyperbolic tilings
Isogonal tilings
Order-6 tilings
Truncated tilings
Uniform tilings
Octagonal tilings